The 88th Emperor's Cup began on September 13, 2008 and ended on January 1, 2009 with the final at National Stadium in Tokyo. As the champion, Gamba Osaka participated in 2009 AFC Champions League.

Calendar

Participants

J.League Division 1 
Consadole Sapporo
Kashima Antlers
Omiya Ardija
Urawa Red Diamonds
Kashiwa Reysol
JEF United Ichihara Chiba
FC Tokyo
Tokyo Verdy
Kawasaki Frontale
Yokohama F. Marinos
Shimizu S-Pulse
Júbilo Iwata
Nagoya Grampus
Albirex Niigata
Kyoto Sanga FC
Gamba Osaka
Vissel Kobe
Oita Trinita

J.League Division 2 
Vegalta Sendai
Montedio Yamagata
Mito HollyHock
Thespa Kusatsu
Yokohama FC
Shonan Bellmare
FC Gifu
Ventforet Kofu
Cerezo Osaka
Sanfrecce Hiroshima
Tokushima Vortis
Ehime FC
Avispa Fukuoka
Sagan Tosu
Roasso Kumamoto

Japan Football League 
Tochigi SC

Prime Minister Cup University football tournament Winner 
Osaka Taiiku University

Prefectures 
Hokkaidō – Dohto University
Aomori – Aomori Yamada High School
Iwate – Grulla Morioka
Miyagi – Sony Sendai FC
Akita – TDK S.C.
Yamagata – Yamagata University
Fukushima – Fukushima United FC
Ibaraki – Ryutsu Keizai University FC
Tochigi – Hitachi Tochigi Uva SC
Gunma – Arte Takasaki
Saitama – Shobi University
Chiba – JEF United Ichihara Chiba Reserves
Tokyo – Kokushikan University
Kanagawa – Yokohama Sports & Culture Club
Niigata – Niigata University of Management
Toyama – Kataller Toyama
Ishikawa – Zweigen Kanazawa
Fukui – Saurcos Fukui
Yamanashi – Tamaho FC
Nagano – Matsumoto Yamaga FC
Gifu – FC Gifu SECOND
Shizuoka – Honda FC
Aichi – Aichi Gakuin University
Mie – Yokkaichi University
Shiga – Sagawa Shiga FC
Kyoto – Sagawa Printing SC
Osaka – Hannan University
Hyōgo – Banditonce Kakogawa FC
Nara – Nara Sangyo University
Wakayama – Kainan FC
Tottori – Gainare Tottori
Shimane – Dezzolla Shimane
Okayama – Fagiano Okayama
Hiroshima – Fukuyama University
Yamaguchi – Hitachi Kasado FC
Tokushima – Tokushima Vortis SECOND
Kagawa – Kamatamare Sanuki
Ehime – Ehime University
Kochi – Kochi University
Fukuoka – New Wave Kitakyushu
Saga – Kyushu INAX S.C.
Nagasaki – Mitsubishi Heavy Industry Nagasaki S.C.
Kumamoto – Ohzu High School
Ōita – Nippon Bunri University
Miyazaki – Honda Lock SC
Kagoshima – Volca Kagoshima
Okinawa – Okinawa Kariyushi FC

Matches
All matches are Japan Standard Time (UTC+9)

First round

Second round

Third round
The 15 J2 teams plus one JFL representative (Tochigi SC) entered at this round.

Fourth round
The 18 J1 teams will enter at this round.

Fifth round

Quarter finals

Semi finals

Final

External links
 Official site of the 88th Emperor's Cup 

2008
Emperors Cup, 2008
Emperors Cup, 2008
2009 in Japanese football